"Occident" is a term for the West, traditionally comprising anything that belongs to the Western world. It is the antonym of Orient, the Eastern world. In English, it has largely fallen into disuse. The term "occidental" is often used to describe objects from the Occident but can be considered an outdated term by some. The term originated with geographical divisions mirroring the cultural divide between the Greek East and the Latin West, and the political divide between the Western and Eastern Roman Empires.

Etymology 
The term "Occident" derives from the Latin word occidens meaning "west" (lit. setting < occido fall/set). In Arabic, the Maghreb "maḡrib"  (< Arabic   "to go down, to set") literally means "the sunset", "the west". Historically, the Maghreb was the southern part of the Western Roman Empire.

Another word for Occident in German is Abendland (rarely: "Okzident"), now mainly poetic, which literally translates as "evening land". The antonym "Morgenland" is also mainly poetic, and refers to Asia.

The opposite term "Orient" derives from the Latin word oriens, meaning "east" (lit. "rising" < orior " rise").

History of the term 

The adjectival term "Occidental" has been used to mean cultures, peoples, countries, European rugs, and goods from the Occident. "Occidental" means generally "western". It is a traditional designation (especially when capitalized) for anything belonging to the Occident or "West" (for Europe), and especially of its Western culture. It indicated the western direction in historical astronomy, often abbreviated "Occ".

In more local uses, "occidental" is also used for western parts of countries, especially in Romance languages. Examples include the "oriental" and "occidental" provinces of Mindoro and Negros in the Philippines, and the French département of Pyrénées-Orientales.

In Occidentalism: The West in the Eyes of its Enemies (2004), Buruma and Margalit said that nationalist and nativist resistance to the West replicates Eastern-world responses against the socioeconomic forces of modernization, which originated in Western culture, among utopian radicals and conservative nationalists who viewed capitalism, liberalism, and secularism as forces destructive of their societies and cultures. While the early responses to the West were a genuine encounter between alien cultures, many of the later manifestations of Occidentalism betray the influence of Western ideas upon Eastern intellectuals, such as the supremacy of the nation-state, the Romantic rejection of rationality, and the spiritual impoverishment of the citizenry of liberal democracies.

Buruma and Margalit trace that resistance to German Romanticism and to the debates, between the Westernizers and the Slavophiles in 19th century Russia, and show that like arguments appear in the ideologies of Zionism, Maoism, Islamism, and Imperial Japanese nationalism. Nonetheless, Alastair Bonnett rejects the analyses of Buruma and Margalit as Eurocentric, and said that the field of Occidentalism emerged from the interconnection of Eastern and Western intellectual traditions.

Notes

Further reading

 Hanafi, Hassan, Muqaddimah fi 'ilm al-istighrab (Introduction to Occidentalism), Cairo, Madbuli, 1991.
 König, Daniel G., Arabic-Islamic Views of the Latin West. Tracing the Emergence of Medieval Europe, Oxford, OUP, 2015.
 Souza, Teotonio R. de, "Orientalism, Occidentosis and Other Viral Strains: Historical Objectivity and Social Responsibilities", in The Portuguese, Indian Ocean and European Bridgeheads, Festschrift in Honour of Prof. K.S. Mathew, eds Pius Malekandathil & Jamal Mohammed, Fundação Oriente, India, 2001. . pp. 452–479. https://web.archive.org/web/20160422180612/https://pt.scribd.com/doc/30027278/Orientalism-Occidentosis-and-Other-Viral-Strains-Historical-Objectivity-and-Social-Responsibilities

External links

The Western Tradition homepage at Annenberg/CPB  – where you can watch each episode on demand for free (Pop-ups required)

Geography terminology
Ethnic and religious slurs
Historical regions
English words
Western culture